Trine Skei Grande (born 2 October 1969) is a Norwegian politician who served as the leader of the Liberal Party of Norway from 2010 to 2020. She also served as Minister of Education from January to March 2020, and as Minister of Culture and Gender Equality from 2018 to 2020. She was also a member of parliament for Oslo from 2001 to 2021.

Early life and education 
Grande was born in Overhalla on 2 October 1969. She studied economics at introductory level at NTNU and later political science and history at introductory level at the University of Oslo. Prior to entering politics full-time she worked as a part-time journalist, a high school teacher and as a lecturer at Nord-Trøndelag University College.

Political career 
The current Storting is her fourth consecutive term as a member, after first serving as deputy Member of Parliament from 2001 for Minister Odd Einar Dørum, and became Parliamentary Leader of the Liberal Party from 2001 until 2005.
She was elected as Member of Parliament in the 2005 parliamentary election, and then re-elected in the 2009 and 2013 parliamentary elections.

Grande was a member of the Liberal Party central board in 1999–2000, and was deputy leader from 2000 until 2010. Grande was elected MP for Oslo in 2009 parliamentary election, although the Liberal Party suffered a severe blow; she and Borghild Tenden of Akershus were the only Liberal MPs to be elected.

She is a member of the Norwegian Association for Women's Rights and has highlighted the legacy of her predecessor as Liberal Party leader Eva Kolstad.

Party leadership 
Following the resignation of Lars Sponheim as party leader, she was elected leader of the Liberal Party at the General Assembly in 2010.

In 2013, under her leadership, the Liberal parliamentary group grew with seven more members of parliament. After January 2018, the Liberal Party entered government as a junior partner with the Conservative and Progress parties, taking three positions in the cabinet. On 11 March 2020, she announced her intention to resign as party leader, minister and not stand for re-election in 2021. She was succeeded by fellow party member Guri Melby as Minister of Education two days later, and as party leader at the party conference in September.

Standing committee membership

 2013–2017 member of Foreign Affairs and Defence
 2009–2013 member of Education, Research and Church Affairs
 2009–2013 member of Enlarged Committee on Foreign Affairs
 2009–2013 member of Scrutiny and Constitutional Affairs
 2009–2013 member of Election Committee
 2005–2009 member of Family and Cultural Affairs
 2005–2009 member of Election Committee
 2001–2005 member of Enlarged Committee on Foreign Affairs
 2001–2005 member of Enlarged Committee on Foreign Affairs
 2001–2005 member of Election Committee

References

1969 births
Living people
Liberal Party (Norway) politicians
Norwegian Association for Women's Rights people
Leaders of political parties in Norway
Members of the Storting
Politicians from Oslo
Women members of the Storting
21st-century Norwegian politicians
21st-century Norwegian women politicians
People from Overhalla
Ministers of Culture of Norway
Ministers of Education of Norway